Poštová banka (Post Bank) is a universal commercial bank, which operates in Slovakia. It has been established on December 31, 1992. The position of Poštová banka on the banking market is supported by the cooperation with Slovenská pošta (Slovak Post). The financial group of Poštová banka includes Poisťovňa Poštovej banky (Post Bank Insurance) and Prvá penzijná správcovská spoločnosť (asset management company).

Headquarters
Poštová banka, a.s., Dvořákovo nábrežie 4, 811 02 Bratislava, Slovakia, www.postovabanka.sk

References

External links
 Poštová banka official site

Banks of Slovakia
Banks established in 1992